BRP Rajah Lakandula (PF-4) was a frigate of the Philippine Navy, and was its only ex-USN . She was also the flagship of the Philippine Navy from 1981 to 1988.

History
BRP Rajah Lakandula (PF-4) was originally an  commissioned by the United States Navy as USS Camp (DE-251) in 1943. In 1956, she was converted to a radar picket ship and later served during the Vietnam War until being decommissioned in 1970.

She was transferred to South Vietnam on 13 February 1971. Renamed frigate RVNS Tran Hung Dao (HQ-1), the ship was stricken from the Naval Vessel Register on 30 December 1975. Following the surrender of the South Vietnamese government on 29 April 1975, Tran Hung Dao escaped to the Philippines.

She was then formally transferred to the Philippines on 5 April 1976, she was commissioned into the Philippine Navy as frigate RPS Rajah Lakandula on 27 July 1976. Received two "E" marks and conferred the Philippine Navy Ship of the Year Award for two consecutive years from 1980 to 1981. Struck from the Navy List in 1988, she was still in use as stationary barracks ship in Subic Bay as of 1999.

Notable operations
On 7 October 1980, Rajah Lakandula was in the vicinity of Sangbay Island in Basilan when Gunnery Officer Ensign Albert V. Majini (PN) died in the line of duty, during an encounter  while directing his gunners. Standing in the open, risking his life, he wanted to get the right range until the enemy gunfire felled him. This earned him the Philippine Medal of Valor.

Technical details

In addition to the above-mentioned guns, she also carries a total of one twin Mk.1 Bofors 40 mm anti-aircraft guns, and eight Mk.4 20 mm Oerlikon cannons.

Notable popular culture
 BRP Rajah Lakandula was among the Philippine Navy ships who battled invading People's Liberation Army – Navy ships in Dale Brown's 1991 novel Sky Masters. In this novel, she was classified as a PF class frigate, and was equipped with a four-shot Mk141 Harpoon missile launcher.

References

External links
 Philippine Navy Official website
 Philippine Fleet Official Website
 Philippine Defense Forum
 NavSource Online: Destroyer Escort Photo Archive
 Hazegray World Navies Today: Philippines
 Naming and Code Designation of PN Ships

Frigates of the Philippine Navy
1943 ships
Ships built in Houston
Edsall-class destroyer escorts